The BMW 320 TC  is a racing car built under Super 2000 specifications, which competed in the FIA World Touring Car Championship from 2011 to 2014. The car came into use as a customer car, after BMW ended their WTCC factory program at the end of the 2010 season.

History

The BMW 320 TC is the further development of the BMW 320si WTCC, with which Andy Priaulx won the World Touring Car Championship for BMW in 2006 and 2007. Well over 60 models have been delivered to date by BMW Motorsport Distribution. 

The new BMW 320 TC, which from  2011 can be used in series in accordance with the new Super 2000 regulations, is driven by a 1.6 litre, DI-turbo, four-cylinder engine, which was possibly based on N13B16. The six-speed, sequential gearbox, which can be used to configure the circuit-specific transmission ratio, is also a new feature.

2011 WTCC regulation changes

In 2011 the FIA introduced the Super 2000 Kit Variant package, which allowed teams and manufacturers to change the engines of Super 2000 racing cars with 1600 ccm turbocharged engines. BMW Motorsport manufactured their own version of the new engine which was available for purchase to customer racing teams from 2011.

The car won five races in the WTCC. Its first victory was achieved by Franz Engstler in Race 2 of 2011 FIA WTCC Race of Germany. The second victory came at 2011 FIA WTCC Race of Japan by Tom Coronel. Norbert Michelisz took the third win in front of his home crowd at the 2012 FIA WTCC Race of Hungary. The fourth and fifth victories came in 2012 FIA WTCC Race of Austria and in 2012 FIA WTCC Race of Japan, both when Stefano D'Aste took the checkered flag in Race 2.

Chassis

The self-supporting BMW 320 TC body is manufactured in BMW Plant Regensburg alongside the production body shells for the BMW 1 and 3 Series.

Compared to the production BMW E90 model, the axles and the suspension geometry has been changed significantly. The new axles design include a camber setting that could be adjusted independently of any other settings parameters, such as roll center and track. This would make the axles easier for semi-professional teams to set up. The track width and camber were increased, while the wheel carrier and bearing were carried over from the production model.

Information

Teams and drivers

Current teams and drivers
The following teams and drivers entered the BMW 320 TC for the 2013 World Touring Car Championship season:

External links 
 Official website of the WTCC

References 

320 TC
Compact cars
Cars introduced in 2006
Touring cars